The Ḥudūd al-ʿĀlam ("Boundaries of the World" or "Limits of the World") is a 10th-century geography book written in Persian by an unknown author from Guzgan (present day northern Afghanistan).

In English, the title is also translated as "The Regions of the World" following Vladimir Minorsky's 1937 translation, in which he commented on the title as follows: "The word ḥudūd (properly 'boundaries') in our case evidently refers to the 'regions within definite boundaries' into which the world is divided in the Ḥ.-'Ā., the author indicating with special care the frontiers of each one of these areas, v.i., p. 30. [As I use the word "region" mostly for nāḥiyat it would have been better, perhaps, to translate Ḥudūd al-Ālam as "The limited areas of the World".]"

Contents

Finished in 982 CE, it was dedicated to Abu'l Haret Muhammad, the ruler of the Farighunids. Its author is unknown, but Vladimir Minorsky has surmised that it might have been written by the enigmatic Šaʿyā bin Farīghūn, author of a pioneer encyclopedia of the sciences, the Jawāmeʿ al-ʿUlum, for an amir of Čaghāniān on the upper Amu Darya in the mid-10th century. The available text of Ḥudūd al-ʿĀlam is part of a larger manuscript which contains other works:

A copy of the Jahān-Nāma ("Book of The World") by Muḥammad ibn Najīb Bakrān
A short passage about music
The Ḥudūd al-ʿĀlam
The Jāmiʿ al-ʿUlūm ("Collection of Knowledge") by Fakhr al-Din al-Razi;

The Ḥudūd al-ʿĀlam contains information about the known world. The anonymous author reports about different countries (nāḥiyat), people, languages, clothing, food, religion, local products, towns and cities, rivers, seas, lakes, islands, the steppe, deserts, topography, politics and dynasties, as well as trade. The inhabited world is divided in Asia, Europe and "Libya" (i.e. the Maghreb). The author counts a total of 45 different countries north of the equator. Among other things, Hudud al-Alam appears to mention a Rus' Khaganate; it refers to the Rus' king as "Khāqān-i Rus".

The author never visited those countries personally, but rather compiled the book from earlier works and tales. He did not indicate his sources, but researchers deduced several 9th-century sources. Minorsky (1937) reconstructed them as follows:
 Non-literary sources, including yādhkird-i haklmān ("memories of the sages"), akhbār ("information [heard]"; more fully ha-akhbār-hā ba-shanidim, "the information that we have heard"), and dhikr ("mention"). It is unclear whether or not these non-literary sources included the author's personal experiences, which were probably limited to his home region of Guzganan, and maybe Gilan.
 Books, called kitāb-hā-yipīshīnagān ("books of the predecessors").
(a) Ibn Khordadbeh (I.Kh.), Book of Roads and Kingdoms. This work shows overlap with the similarly titled now-lost book Kitāb al-Masālik wal-Mamālik written by Abu Abdallah Muhammad ibn Ahmad al-Jayhani, and therefore these books were sometimes confused with each other.
(b) An unknown source also used by Ahmad ibn Rustah, Al-Bakri, Gardizi, Muhammad Aufi, and others. This unknown source is usually identified as the lost book Kitāb al-Masālik wal-Mamālik written by Jayhani.
(c) Istakhri (Ist.), Masālik al-Mamālik ("Routes of the Realms") or kitab al-masalik wa-l-mamalik ( "Book of Roads and Kingdoms", or "Book of the Paths and Provinces"). As his source, Istakhri used the work of Abu Zayd al-Balkhi, the Figures of the Regions (Suwar al-aqalim), and thus he belonged to the Balkhī school. The Balkhī school also included Ibn Hawqal and Al-Maqdisi, whose works show significant overlap with the Ḥudūd al-ʿĀlam, but they appear to have directly copied their content from Istakhri rather than via Ḥudūd al-ʿĀlam.
(d) Al-Masudi, The Meadows of Gold. According to Minorsky (1937), as Ḥudūd al-ʿĀlam contains more details about the same topics, the author probably did not directly copy from Masudi's work, but they both drew from a common source 'of which Mas'udī possessed only an abstract. Possibly the same source is responsible for the interesting details on Gīlān.'
(e) Some contents about Arabia appear to derive from Hamdani's Geography of the Arabian Peninsula, perhaps a more complete version of Ibn Khordadbeh's work, or a yet unknown source.

Rediscovery and translation

The Orientalist Russian scholar Alexander Tumansky found a manuscript with a copy of this text in 1892 in Bukhara. The copy from the original was made by the Persian chronographer Abu l-Mu'ayyad ʿAbd al-Qayyūm ibn al-Ḥusain ibn 'Alī al-Farīsī in 1258. The facsimile edition with introduction and index was published by Vasily Bartold in 1930; a thoroughly commented English translation was made by Vladmir Minorsky in 1937, and a printed Persian text by Manouchehr Sotudeh in 1962.

Importance

The sections of its geographical treatise which describes the margins of Islamic world, are of great historical importance. The work also includes important early descriptions of the Turkic peoples in Central Asia. Also noteworthy is the archaic language and style of the Ḥudud, which makes it a valuable Persian linguistic document as well.

See also
Ibn Khordadbeh

References

Literature
 
 Bosworth, C. E. in: Encyclopaedia of Islam. New Edition, s.v. ḤUDŪD AL-ʿĀLAM

External links
Hudud al-'Alam, The Regions of the World
Hudud al-'Alam at Google Books

10th-century manuscripts
Atlases
10th-century books
Persian literature